Tukwila may refer to:
 Tukwila, Washington, a town in Washington, United States
 Tukwila (Amtrak station), a Sounder train station serving the city of Tukwila, Washington
 Tukwila (processor), an Intel Itanium 2 processor released in February 2010